The Oaklawn Farm Zoo is a zoo located in Millville, Nova Scotia, Canada, just south of the village of Aylesford. It was opened in 1984, and is family-owned and operated by Ron and Gail Rogerson. The zoo boasts the largest display of Big Cats and Primates in Eastern Canada. The  zoo is in a rural setting in Nova Scotia's Annapolis Valley, and includes a wide diversity of mammals, birds and reptiles.

As Nova Scotia's largest zoo, Oaklawn has a large variety of endangered and threatened species of exotic, native and domestic breeds of animals. Children can feed corn to some of the animals (notably the deer and goats) and the zoo has a restaurant and gift shop. Feeding time for the big cats and bears is a popular zoo attraction. Owner Gail Rogerson enters the cages of these animals and will hand feed them meat that is collected from local farms and surrounding areas.

The zoo is open Easter weekend through November, and closed to the public during the winter.

Origin 
Ron and Gail Rogerson started a farm in the 1970s with conventional animals and some exotic animals. Schools went on field trips to the farm to learn about the animals by 1975.  A program known as “Learning to Live” started in 1980 which allowed children to get experience with how to take care of animals.  In 1984 the farm decided to open as a zoo and incorporated many new animals into the facility.

Animals

An African lion named Rutledge was born at the zoo in 1991 and hand raised. He was euthanized in February 2009 just short of his 18th birthday, and buried at the zoo. Another male African lion, Obi, was diagnosed with kidney failure in October 2017 and was euthanized on 6 August 2019. 

Animals include 

Capybara
Mara
Pot-bellied pig
North American porcupine
Crested porcupine
Brazilian agouti
Dromedary camel
Bactrian camel
Meerkat
South African cheetah
Lion
Siberian tiger
Chilean rose tarantula
Goliath birdeater
Eastern painted turtle
Red-footed tortoise
Tokay gecko
Squirrel monkey
Green iguana
Common marmoset
Straw-coloured fruit bat
Spider monkey
Snowy owl
Barred owl
Great horned owl
Common raven
American black bear
Masked lovebird
Burmese python
Japanese macaque
Lion-tailed macaque
Rhea
Black swan
Llama
Indian peafowl
Alpaca
Guanaco
Zonkey
Cougar
Plains zebra
Ostrich
Common snapping turtle
Bald eagle
Jaguar
Serval
Leopard cat
Caracal lynx
Domestic cat
Ferret

References

External links

Zoos in Nova Scotia
Buildings and structures in Kings County, Nova Scotia
Tourist attractions in Kings County, Nova Scotia
Zoos established in 1984